Hippeastrum puniceum is a bulbous perennial native to tropical regions of South America, although it has become naturalized elsewhere. Common names include Barbados lily, Easter lily, cacao lily, cocoa lily and amaryllis lily, although it is neither a lily nor a species of Amaryllis.

Description
Plants have 4–6 leaves, each of which is bright green, 30–60 cm long by 2.5–3 cm wide, strap-shaped (lorate) and tapers at the end to an acute apex. The leaves are not fully developed when the flowers appear (i.e. they are more or less hysteranthous). The flowers are borne in an umbel on a stem (scape) which is 40–60 cm tall. The umbel has lanceolate green bracts at its base. The petals, or more accurately tepals, are orange-red with paler bases. The lower two tepals are much narrower than the lateral ones.

References

External links
 Hortus Camdenensis: Hippeastrum puniceum
 
 

puniceum
Flora of South America
Plants described in 1783